Wushan may refer to the following locations in the People's Republic of China:

Wushan County, Chongqing (巫山县)
Wu Mountains, or Wushan (巫山), mountainous region
Wushan County, Gansu (武山县), county of Tianshui City, Gansu
Wushan, Lechang (五山), town of Lechang, Guangdong
Wushan, Shandong (吾山), town of Anqiu, Shandong
Wushan Subdistrict, Guangzhou (五山街道), subdistrict in Tianhe District, Guangzhou, Guangdong
Wushan Subdistrict, Changsha (乌山街道), subdistrict in Wangcheng District, Changsha, Hunan
Wushan, Sui County, town in Sui County, Suizhou, Hubei, China

See also
 Wushan Man